Bonnie Fiedorek Sloane is a distinguished professor at Wayne State University known for her research on cancer. In 2021 she was elected a fellow of the American Association for the Advancement of Science.

Education and career 
Sloane was born in 1944 in Detroit, Michigan. Sloane has a B.S. (1966) and an M.A. (1968) from Duke University (1966). She earned her Ph.D. from Rutgers University in 1976. Following her Ph.D. she did postdoctoral work at the University of Pennsylvania, and in 1979 was an assistant professor at the University of Pennsylvania. She then moved to Michigan State University where she was an assistant professor from 1979 until 1980 when she moved to Wayne State University as an assistant professor. She was promoted to professor in 1989, and in 2005 she was named distinguished professor.

From 2009 until 2011, Sloane was president of the Association of Medical Pharmacology, the first women to serve in this role.

Research 
Sloane is known for her research on cancer, especially breast cancer. Her research has examined cathepsins and proteases associated with cancer. She has also used imaging with fluorescent probes to track the activity of proteases.

Selected publications 

 
 </ref>

Awards and honors 
In 2021 Sloane was named a fellow of the American Association for the Advancement of Science.

References

External links 
 

Living people
1944 births
Fellows of the American Association for the Advancement of Science
Wayne State University faculty
Cancer researchers
Women medical researchers
Duke University alumni
Rutgers University alumni